Sweden competed at the 2017 World Championships in Athletics in London, United Kingdom, from 4–13 August 2017. 32 athletes were selected to compete for Sweden.

Medalists

Results

Men
Track and road events

Field events

Combined events – Decathlon

Women
Track and road events

Field events

References

Nations at the 2017 World Championships in Athletics
World Championships in Athletics
Sweden at the World Championships in Athletics